Robert Harcourt (1902–1969) was a Northern Irish politician. 

Robert Harcourt may also refer to:

Robert Harcourt (explorer) (c. 1574–1631), English explorer of Guiana
Robert Harcourt (Liberal politician) (1878–1962), British diplomat, playwright, and MP